Komander (born December 15, 1998 in Reynosa, Tamaulipas) is a Mexican luchador, a masked professional wrestler, currently working with Lucha Libre AAA Worldwide (AAA). He made his debut for the promotion in Saltillo on August 10, 2019 in a winning effort teaming with Eclipse Jr. and Lady Shani vs. Villano III Jr., Australian Suicide and La Hiedra. In 2021, Komander participated in the Alas de Oro annual cibernetico at Verano de Escandalo. He has also appeared for notable promotions such as Lucha Memes, MDA, Pro Wrestling Mexico, EMLL and WAR City. In 2022 he recurrently wrestled in the United States for Game Changer Wrestling.

His gimmick and nicknames is El As del Espacio (meaning The Ace of Space) and El humilde luchador (The humble luchador). His official theme song named after his catchphrase ¿Quién anda ahí? (Who's there?) is rapped and produced by himself. He uses a Shooting Star Press for his finisher, sometimes featuring a corkscrew.

Professional wrestling career 

Komander is a first-generation luchador, meaning he is the first member of his family to become a wrestler.

Arena Coliseo Reynosa (2012–2017) 
He started training remarkably early for a first-generation wrestler - stating in one interview he started practising his signature rope walk at age 12. He made his debut in 2012, working matches in his hometown Reynosa, Rio Bravo, Matamoros, Monterrey and Parras de la Fuente. Working in all three of the big venues in Reynosa, Arena Juba, Arena Deportivo Reynosa (formerly Arena el Angel) and most importantly Arena Coliseo Reynosa. He was quickly picked up by War City Wrestling, a regional wrestling promotion in Reynosa and surroundings. This relationship also made it possible for him to get bookings in Zacatecas.

In 2014 he formed the team Reyes del Aire del Reynosa with Rey Astral and Magnifico, and they went on to become WAR City Trios champions in 2015. Being regarded as a highly skilled worker and flyer known for his various ropetricks and creativity, Komander quickly gained popularity among the fans and was regarded as the biggest star in Reynosa during this time until 2017.  He had rivalries with Monterrey wrestlers Ronaldinho and El Divo. He and Ronaldinho feuded back and forth over the WAR City Cruiserweight Championship, and on October 4 they had a mask and championship (Komander) vs. hair (Ronaldinho) match, which Komander won. However he later lost the title to Ronaldinho in a non-apuesta match.

Mexico independent scene (2017–present) 
In 2017, Komander decided to focus full time on being a wrestler and starting looking for bookings all over the country and not only locally. He stated he wanted to wrestle outside of Reynosa more often and that is ultimate goal was to get into Lucha Libre AAA Worldwide. 

In May 2017, Komander made his Mexico City debut after being discovered by the promotion Lucha Memes. He lost his first match, a singles match vs. veteran wrestler Eterno in Arena Coliseo Coacalco. He wrestled for Lucha Memes twice more in 2018, losing once and one match vs. Iron Kid resulting in a no-contest after Komander was unable to finish after hitting the ground hard after a suicide dive and needing medical attention.

Throughout 2018 and 2019 he started wrestling more in Monterrey, taking part in a lot of events hosted by Monterrey based promotions such as MDA, KAOZ Lucha Libre and EMLL. 

In 2019, he took part in a torneo cibernetico elimination match as part of the Battle of Naucalpan show, co-hosted by Lucha Memes and MexaWrestling.

In 2020 he participated in a tournament called Luchando por un Sueño hosted by Monterrey-based promoyion Kaoz Lucha Libre. Together with teammate Dulce Canela, they made it all the way to the final but was defeated by the team of Emperador Azteca and Zeuxis.

The 15th of November 2020, Komander made his debut for International Wrestling Revolution Group (IWRG). 

On the 20th of June, 2021, at an AAA/Kaoz event at Estadio Mobil Super in Monterrey, Komander defeated Toxin, Villano III Jr., Charro Negro and Dinamico to claim the KAOZ Cruiserweight Junior Title. Komander's reign would last four defenses, until June 2nd 2022, when he dropped the title to Dinamico at a IWRG event.

Since early 2021, Komander has been part of the gym and promotion Big Lucha, run by fellow professional wrestler Bandido. At an event on August 29th that year, Komander was scheduled to wrestle Emperador Azteca in a singles match. However a few minutes into the match, Komander would suffer a knee ligament injury. After undergoing successful surgery, it was announced he would be out of action the rest of the year. However, he would end up returning already in mid November.

On June 2, 2022 he would lose the Kaoz Junior Cruiserweight Title to Dinamico in a 5-way match at the International Wrestling Revolution Group Villanos vs. Brazos-event.

Lucha Libre AAA Worldwide (2019–present) 
Komander technically made his AAA debut already in 2015, working a AAA Sin Limite show in his hometown of Reynosa. However that match was considered a Dark Match since it never made TV. Komander was also underage at the time and would have been unable to officially sign a contract with AAA. 

Komander was supposed to make his debut for AAA on June 9, 2019 in Monterrey but was replaced at the last second by another wrestler for unknown reasons. On July 21 he wrestled for Pro Wrestling Mexico in Monterrey, a local promotion affiliated with AAA. 

He finally made his official debut for the promotion in Saltillo on August 10, 2019 in a winning effort teaming with Eclipse Jr. and Lady Shani vs. Villano III Jr., Australian Suicide and La Hiedra.

On November 9, 2019, Komander and Mr. Iguana defeated Mini Psycho Clown and Parkita Negra in Torreon, Coahuila. 

At Verano de Escándalo (2021) in Tequisquiapan, Querétaro, Komander made his first major event and Pay-per-view appearance for the promotion, participating in the semi annual Alas de Oro cibernetico-match won by El Hijo del Vikingo. After Verano de Escándalo, Komander went from appearing in AAA once every few months to wrestling on most AAA TV events all across Mexico. At Triplemanía XXX in Monterrey April 30th 2022, in a match for the AAA World Mixed Tag Team Championships, Komander would team with Sexy Star (II) against the teams of Arez and Chik Tormenta, Látigo and Maravilla, and the eventual winners, Tay Conti and Sammy Guevara (with La Parka Negra). 

At the annual Saltillomania event in Saltillo, August 20th, Komander teamed up with Aero Star and Baby Extreme in a winning effort against Argenis, La Parka Negra and Villano III Jr.

United States (2022–present) 
Komander would make his United States debut on the 18th of June for Game Changer Wrestling at their New York City-event You Wouldn’t Understand, participating in a 7-way scramble match. The following day in Providence, Rhode Island at I Never Liked You, he would team up with Ciclope and Miedo Extremo in a losing effort against ASF, Drago Kid and Gringo Loco. Komander would return to GCW the following month, wrestling Tony Deppen on July 15th at No Signal In The Hills 2 in Los Angeles. Two days later he would wrestle Gringo Loco in another singles match, this time in San Francisco at the Back To The Bay event. He would once again wrestle a 6-man tag for GCW at The People vs. GCW in Nashville, Tennessee, July 29th, teaming with Laredo Kid and ASF, they would end up losing against Black Taurus, Gringo Loco and Jack Cartwheel.

On June 30th, he was one of the competitors in the Bunkhouse Battle Royal-match at the Ric Flair's Last Match PPV. 

Komander competed in the West Coast Cup single-elimination tournament, ran by promotion West Coast Pro in San Francisco, August 18th and 19th 2022. In the first round he would defeat Midas Kreed, and then advance directly to the semifinal due to his quarterfinal opponent Vinnie Massaro being unable to compete due to injury. He lost the semifinal match against Starboy Charlie.

He has also appeared in Ohio for Absolute Intense Wrestling, in Chicago for GALLI Lucha Libre, and in Corpus Christi, Texas for 3Bat Promotions among other places.

On March 1, 2023, Komander debuted in All Elite Wrestling, taking part in the Face of the Revolution ladder match, which was won by Powerhouse Hobbs.

Japan (2022–present) 
Komander appeared in Gleat on the Gleat Ver. EX-show in Korakuen Hall on October 9, 2022, marking his Japanese debut. Together with Bandido, they defeated Kaz Hayashi and Soma Watanabe and the match was well received.

Championships and accomplishments 
 WAR City Wrestling
 WAR City Cruiserweight Championship (3 times) 
 WAR City Tag Team Championship (1 time) – with Angel-O
 WAR City Trios Championship (2 times) – with Rey Astral and Magnifico

 KAOZ Lucha Libre
 KAOZ Junior Cruiserweight Championship (1 time)

Luchas de Apuestas record

References

External links 
Official theme song and highlight video

1998 births
Living people
Masked wrestlers
Mexican male professional wrestlers
Professional wrestlers from Tamaulipas
Unidentified wrestlers
People from Reynosa
21st-century professional wrestlers